Santo Spirito dei Napoletani is a Roman Catholic church on via Giulia, in the Regola rione of Rome. It was the national church of the Kingdom of the Two Sicilies and is now the regional church for Campania.

History
In Pope Pius V's catalogue of churches, this church is known as 'S. Aura in strada Iulia' (Saint Aurea in the via Julia) and was then part of a monastery. It was dedicated to Saint Aurea, a martyr from Ostia. In the 14th century it was also known as 'Sant'Eusterio', as a result of the catalogue of Cencio Camerario (n. 232) and of the anonymous Turin catalogue, which states "Ecclesia s. Austerii de campo Senensi habet unum sacerdotem" (the church of s. Austerii in campo Senensi has one priest). By 1572 the church was in a poor state - that year, it and the monastery were assigned to the Confraternity of the Holy Spirit of the Neapolitans. The Confraternity demolished the existing church and built a new one dedicated to the Holy Spirit, which was inaugurated in 1574.

The church was rebuilt twice more, to designs by Domenico Fontana or perhaps Ottaviano Mascherino at the end of the 16th century. At the beginning of the 18th century it was given a major redesign by Carlo Fontana. Antonio Cipolla carried out major restorations to the interior and rebuilt the facade in 1853.

It was the burial place of Francis II of the Two Sicilies, his wife Maria Sophie and their three-month-old only daughter Cristina. It was also the national church for the Kingdom of the Two Sicilies from 1934 until 1984, when the three royal burials were transferred to Santa Chiara in Naples. The church was closed for thirty years due to water leaks and its abandoned state, but was restored in the 1980s and reopened for worship in 1986.

Description

External links
 Interactive Nolli Map Website

Sources 
 Mariano Armellini, Le chiese di Roma dal secolo IV al XIX, Roma 1891
 Christian Hulsen, Le chiese di Roma nel Medio Evo, Firenze 1927
 F. Titi, Descrizione delle Pitture, Sculture e Architetture esposte in Roma, Roma 1763

Bibliography 

 P. Di Giammaria, Spirito Santo dei Napoletani, Fratelli Palombi Editori, Roma 1999
 C. Rendina, Le Chiese di Roma, Newton & Compton Editori, Milano 2000
 M. Quercioli, Rione VII Regola, in AA.VV, I rioni di Roma, Newton & Compton Editori, Milano 2000, Vol. II, pp. 448–498

Roman Catholic churches in Rome
National churches in Rome
Spirito Santo dei Napoletani
16th-century Roman Catholic church buildings in Italy
19th-century Roman Catholic church buildings in Italy